Grupo Desportivo de Lam Pak (Traditional Chinese: 藍白, meaning blue white, the club colours) is a Macau professional football club, which plays in the town of Macau. They play in the Macau's first division, the Campeonato da 1ª Divisão do Futebol.
Lam Pak is one of the strong teams in Macau.

Achievements
Macau Championship: 9
 1992, 1994, 1997, 1998, 1999, 2001, 2006, 2007, 2009
Taça de Macau: 1
 2012

Continental record

1 Lam Pek withdrew after the first leg.

Players

Current squad
Season 2012.

References

Football clubs in Macau